A gazelle is an antelope. 

Gazelle may also refer to:

Military
 Gazelle-class cruiser, a light cruiser class of the Imperial German Navy
 SMS Gazelle, the lead ship of the class
 SMS Gazelle (1859), a screw-driven frigate of the Prussian Navy
 USS Gazelle, three United States Navy ships
 HMS Gazelle (J342), Royal Navy Catherine-class minesweeper during the Second World War
 Gazelle FRV, a scouting vehicle developed by Zimbabwe
 Aérospatiale Gazelle, a French-designed helicopter
 Operation Gazelle, an Israeli offensive in the Yom Kippur War
 53T6 (NATO reporting name: ABM-3 Gazelle), a Russian anti-ballistic missile deployed in the Moscow area
 Gazelle Force, a battalion-size force in the East African Campaign of the Second World War

Places
 Gazelle, California, a census-designated place
 Gazelle District, Papua New Guinea
 Gazelle Peninsula, Papua New Guinea
 Cape Gazelle, Papua New Guinea
 Gazelle Valley, an open space in Jerusalem

Computing
 Gazelle (Internet company), an e-commerce company for electronic devices 
 Gazelle (software company), a Japanese arcade game developer founded in 1994
 Gazelle (web browser), a web browser project by Microsoft
 Seattle Computer Products Gazelle, a computer

Transportation
 Gazelle (bicycle), the largest bicycle manufacturer in the Netherlands
 Gazelle (motor vessel), a launch that operated in Oregon, US, 1905–1929
 Gazelle (sidewheeler 1854), a steamboat that operated in Oregon, US
 GAZelle, a series of mid-sized trucks, vans and buses made by Russian manufacturer GAZ
 Nissan Gazelle, a compact three-door hatchback produced by Nissan
 De Havilland DH.15 Gazelle, an engine test bed
 Hillman Gazelle, an automobile produced by Chrysler Australia
 Napier Gazelle, an aircraft engine
 Singer Gazelle, two generations of British motor cars
 Stutz Defender, later named Gazelle, an armored SUV
 Gazelle, a South Devon Railway Eagle class steam locomotive
 La Gazelle, a train service operated by the Congo–Ocean Railway

Sports
 Gazelle FC, a football club in Chad
 Gazelle Stakes, an annual American Thoroughbred horse race at Aqueduct Racetrack in New York, US
 Willem II–Gazelle, a Dutch professional cycling team known as Gazelle in 1971

Fictional characters
 Gazelle (DC Comics), a DC Comics character
 Gazelle (Marvel Comics), a Marvel Comics character
 Gazelle (New-Gen), another Marvel Comics character
 Gazelle, a character from Zootopia
 The Gazelles, three characters in Peppa Pig

See also
 Gazell, a Swedish jazz record label
 Gazzelle (born 1989), Italian singer-songwriter
 HaZvi (also Hatzevi, meaning The Gazelle), a Hebrew-language newspaper published in Jerusalem from 1884 to 1914